Heptanone may refer to the following ketones with seven carbon atoms the formula C7H14O:

 2-Heptanone (Methyl amyl ketone)
 5-Methyl-2-hexanone (Methyl isoamyl ketone)
 4-Methyl-2-hexanone (Methyl 2-methylbutyl ketone)
 3-Methyl-2-hexanone (Methyl 1-methylbutyl ketone)
 3,3-Dimethyl-2-pentanone 
 4,4-Dimethyl-2-pentanone (Methyl neopentyl ketone)
 3,4-Dimethyl-2-pentanone
 3-Ethyl-2-pentanone
 3-Heptanone 
 2,4-Dimethyl-3-pentanone (Diisopropyl ketone)
 2,2-Dimethyl-3-pentanone
 2-Ethyl-3-pentanone
 4-Heptanone 
 2-Methyl-3-hexanone (Isopropyl propyl ketone)
 4-Methyl-3-hexanone (Ethyl sec-butyl ketone)
 5-Methyl-3-hexanone (Ethyl isobutyl ketone)

See also 
 Cycloheptanone
 Methylcyclohexanone
 2-Methylcyclohexanone
 3-Methylcyclohexanone
 4-Methylcyclohexanone